The jack of the United States, referred to as the Union Jack by the U.S. Navy, is a maritime jack flag flown on the bow of U.S. vessels that are moored or anchored. In addition to commissioned U.S. Navy ships, the jack is used by the U.S. Coast Guard, the Military Sealift Command, the ships of the National Oceanic and Atmospheric Administration, and other U.S. government entities. While anchored or moored, the jack is flown on the bow of a ship, and the ensign (which for the U.S. Navy is the national flag) is flown on the stern. Once under way, the jack is lowered.

The Union Jack was adopted on June 14, 1777, alongside the U.S. national flag itself. Since then, the jack has essentially consisted of the canton of the national flag, with each star added to the national flag being added to the Union Jack also.

It is widely held that, before the Union Jack, the jack of the United States was the First Navy Jack. The exact historical appearance of this flag is disputed, but it is displayed today by the Navy bearing a rattlesnake and motto. During the last several decades, the Union Jack has sometimes been temporarily removed from use—such as from 1975 to 1976, when the First Navy Jack was flown for the U.S. Bicentennial, in 2000, when submarines and submarine tenders flew a special jack for the hundredth anniversary of the first commissioned U.S. Navy submarine, and for all warships from 2002 to 2019, when the Navy flew the First Navy Jack for the Global War on Terrorism.

The oldest commissioned warship in active U.S. naval status (that is, having the longest total period in active status) flies the First Navy Jack, and is the only active U.S. warship that flies a different jack than the Union Jack.

History
For most of U.S. history, the primary jack design has been the blue canton with stars (the "union") from the U.S. national ensign. The blue fielded, white-starred jack is referred to as the "Union Jack," not to be confused with the Union Jack of the United Kingdom, which has the same name but a different design. Like the U.S. ensign, the number of stars on the jack correspond with the number of constituent states the U.S. has. Rules for flying the jack are similar to the national ensign, except that the jack is only flown at the bow when the ship is anchored, made fast or alongside.

The only written description of the Navy Jack dating from the American Revolutionary war is a January 1776 document titled Signals for the American Fleet by Commodore Esek Hopkins. Hopkins discusses "the strip'd jack" and a "striped flag" as symbols of the Continental Navy. No snake nor field of stars is mentioned, though the exact appearance of these flags is not known. A print of American ships from August 1776 shows one ship flying a striped flag and another the Pine Tree Flag, both from the stern, the customary place for a national ensign.

The 48 star version of the Union Jack flag became official in 1912 after Arizona and New Mexico became states. Throughout WWI and WWII, and until 1959 the Union Jack flag consisted of 48 stars.

From September 11, 2002, the U.S. Navy made use of the so-called First Navy Jack. However, the standard U.S. jack (i.e. 50 white stars alternative in columns of four and five defacing a blue field) continued to be used as the jack by vessels of U.S. federal agencies such as the U.S. Coast Guard, the Military Sealift Command and the National Oceanic and Atmospheric Administration Corps and by U.S. civilian ships and by U.S. yachts. The majority of the U.S. Navy's warships returned to using the U.S. Union Jack on June 4, 2019.

The jack is flown from the jackstaff from 08:00 to sunset while U.S. Navy ships are moored or at anchor. It is required to be the same size as the union of the ensign being flown from the stern of the ship. It is also flown from the yardarm during a general court-martial or court of inquiry. During times when the ensign is at half mast, the jack is also at half mast. The jack is hoisted smartly and lowered ceremoniously in the same manner as the ensign, however the jack is not dipped when the ensign is dipped.

Some other exceptions to the use of the U.S. Union Jack have occurred in the case of the U.S. Navy, the most prominent being the use of the First Navy Jack by the U.S. Navy in honor of the U.S. founding's bicentennial and for other uses subsequently.  For example, following the Bicentennial, in August 1980, use of the First Navy Jack was granted to the active commissioned ship having the longest total period of front-line operational service, said use to be in place of the Union Jack until that ship was decommissioned or transferred to inactive status, whereupon the next such ship in seniority inherits the honor of its use.  This use is limited to the oldest "commissioned" naval vessel (i.e., an all-military United States Ship [ship prefix USS] versus a part-military/part-civilian crewed United States Naval Ship [ship prefix USNS]) in front-line operational service.

On June 3, 1999, the Secretary of the Navy also authorized the flying of the Submarine Centennial Jack on all U.S. Navy submarines and submarine tenders during 2000.

On February 21, 2019, the Chief of Naval Operations directed that U.S. Navy warships fly the U.S. jack again beginning on June 4, 2019. The oldest active U.S. warship flies the First Navy Jack; that ship has been  since 2014.

Naval jacks of the United States by date

See also
Flag of the United States 
Flags of the United States Armed Forces

Notes

References

Continental Navy
United States Navy
Military flags of the United States
United States